Geniben Nagajibhai Thakor is an Indian politician and member of the legislative assembly of Gujarat legislative assembly elected from Vav assembly constituency. She contested 2017 Gujarat legislative assembly election from Indian National Congress and won against Shankar Chaudhary of Bharatiya Janata Party.

Political career 
Thakor contested 2012 Gujarat legislative assembly election from Vav but was lost. She contested 2017 Gujarat legislative assembly election from Vav constituency and won with margin of 6655 votes. Thakor is considered as close-aide of Alpesh Thakor by media sources. She was elected again from Vav in 2022 Gujarat Legislative Assembly election.

Views 
In 2019, Geni Thakor supported the decision of  Thakor community to ban use of mobile phones for unmarried girls of community. Thakor said that nothing was wrong in move to ban mobile for girls and "they should stay away from community and spend more time in studying". Previously, in 2018, she provoked people to burn the rape accused instead of handing them to police. Later, she clarified that she was trying 'to calm down women'.

References 

Living people
Gujarat MLAs 2017–2022
Gujarat MLAs 2022–2027
Indian National Congress politicians from Gujarat
1975 births
Women in Gujarat politics
21st-century Indian women politicians
21st-century Indian politicians
People from Banaskantha district